Jordanus Hoorn (1753–1833) was a painter and drawing teacher from the Northern Netherlands.

Biography
Hoorn was born and died in Amersfoort.  According to the RKD he was the son of a cloth merchant who became a pupil of the landscape painter Gerrit Toorenburgh and who worked in Haarlem 1772-1795, including a period as drawing master for the Tekenschool voor Kunstambachten. In 1795 under French rule, he returned to Amersfoort where he was appointed city drawing master. His pupils were Jan van Ravenswaay, Jan Apeldoorn, and Christiaan Wilhelmus Moorrees.

References

Jordanus Hoorn on Artnet

1753 births
1833 deaths
Dutch painters
Dutch male painters
People from Amersfoort